Adalberto Batista Garcia (born 31 August 1967) is a Brazilian long-distance runner. He competed in the men's 5000 metres at the 1996 Summer Olympics.

References

External links
 

1967 births
Living people
Athletes (track and field) at the 1996 Summer Olympics
Brazilian male long-distance runners
Olympic athletes of Brazil
Place of birth missing (living people)
Sportspeople from São Paulo (state)